The Juab County Jail, located at 45 W. Center in Nephi, in Juab County, Utah, was built in 1892 and served as the main jail in the county for more than 80 years.  It is a two-story structure and is one of the biggest and best preserved jails from the early 20th century or before that survives in the state of Utah.

It was listed on the National Register of Historic Places in 1987.

See also
Stockton Jail, NRHP-listed in Tooele County, Utah

References 

Jails on the National Register of Historic Places in Utah
Prairie School architecture in Utah
Government buildings completed in 1892
Buildings and structures in Juab County, Utah
Jails in Utah
National Register of Historic Places in Juab County, Utah